Luna Sea is the debut studio album by Japanese rock band Luna Sea, released on April 21, 1991 by Extasy Records. It sold over 30,000 copies by July 1992. After reuniting in 2010, Luna Sea re-recorded the whole album and released it on March 16, 2011 through HPQ.

Overview 
At a sold-out February 11, 1991 concert at Meguro Rock-May-Kan, Lunacy were discovered by X Japan guitarist hide and were signed by X Japan co-founder Yoshiki to his independent record label Extasy Records. The band changed their name from Lunacy to Luna Sea and took part in the label's sold out Nuclear Fusion Tour in March with Gilles de Rais and Sighs of Love Potion. On the tour, a 3-track sample CD including a song from each band was freely distributed, to which they contributed a short sample of "Precious". Their self-titled debut album was released on April 21, 1991. In support of the record, they held their first nationwide tour Under the New Moon, which started on June 13 and was separated into two legs or "Episodes" with a final concert held on September 19. However, a third leg of 17 shows was performed from October 13 to December 30. Luna Sea is the band's only release on an indie label as they signed to MCA Victor for their second album, 1992's Image.

The album's cover photo was taken in Inokashira Park in the winter. "Time is Dead" is a re-written version of "Sexual" (later called "Sexual ") from their 1989 demo tape "Lunacy". It is the first original song that J ever wrote. "Shade" was re-recorded from their 1989 demo of the same name.  is translated as "Almost Transparent Blue," which comes from the Ryū Murakami novel of the same name. A longer, reworked version of "Moon" was recorded for their second album Image. "Precious..." was re-recorded for the 2000 compilation album Period -the Best Selection-. It was also covered by Merry for the 2007 Luna Sea Memorial Cover Album -Re:birth-.

The album was remastered by Ted Jensen and re-released by Universal Music Group on December 5, 2007. This edition came with a DVD which contained live promotional videos for the songs "Moon" and "Precious...", that were recorded at Nippon Seinenkan on September 19, 1991. It reached number 123 on the Oricon Albums Chart.

Track listing 
All lyrics written by Ryuichi, except "Shade" by J and Ryuichi.

Personnel 
Luna Sea
Vocals: Ryuichi
Guitar: Sugizo
Guitar: Inoran
Bass: J
Drums: Shinya

Production
Producer and arranger: Luna Sea
Engineers: Yoshiaki Kondo, Takao Okimoto, Atsushi Tanaka
Direction: Mr. Hattori, Makoto Ebina, Akihiro Nagasaka
Jacket design and photos: Miss Saori Tsuji
Costume coordinator: Miss Sayuri Chihara 
Hair stylist: Tetsuya Endo
Road crew: Ippei Kuwabara, Seiji Noro, Atsushi Naito, Yosuke Narita, Kenichi Nanba
Personnel per album's liner notes.

2011 re-recording 

In 2011, the band re-recorded the whole album and released it on March 16 on their new label HPQ, which is owned by Avex Group. When asked why they chose to re-record the album, Sugizo said "It’s sort of like returning to our origins. After ten years, we have to recreate ourselves, and going back to something as original and basic as our first album is part of the process. It’s very important to be able to recapture that feeling, and to recreate it with our current skills to show how we’ve improved over the years.", and Ryuichi added "The sound we have now has a similar feeling to our first album." It is notable that the version of "Moon" that appears on the re-recording is of the longer version of the song from their second album, Image.

It was released in three editions; a regular, a limited with a DVD of a music video for "Shade" that uses footage from their Lunacy Kurofuku Gentei Gig ~the Holy Night~ free concert on December 25, 2010, and a premium which includes a reproduction cassette of their 1989 demo "Shade" and a reproduction shirt from their 1991 Under the New Moon Episode I-III tours. The album reached number six on the Oricon Albums Chart and charted for seven weeks.

Track listing

Personnel 
Luna Sea
Vocals:Ryuichi
Guitar, violin: Sugizo
Guitar: Inoran
Bass: J
Drums: Shinya

Production
Producer: Luna Sea
Keyboard and sound effect programmer: Daisuke "d-kiku" Kikuchi
Recording and mixing engineer: Hitoshi Hiruma
Recording engineers: Kenichi Arai, Masaaki Tsuya (Kamome Studio), Tasumasa Yamashita, Akinori Kaizaki
Recording assistant engineers: Yosuke Watanabe (Victor Studio), Junpei Ohno (Studio Sound Dali), Masayoshi Shinomiya (Studio Sound Dali), Tomotaka Saka (Wonder Station)
Mixing assistant engineer: Yujiro Yonetsu (Prime Sound Studio Form)
Mastering engineer: Ted Jensen (Sterling Sound)
Mastering coordinator: Tsuyoshi Niwa (Sterling Sound)
Additional mastering engineer: Kazushige Yamazaki (Flair Mastering), Ayako Kawamoto (Flair Mastering)
Art direction and design: Shizuka Aikawa (Avex Marketing Inc.)
Photograph: Yosuke Komatsu (Odd Job, Ltd.)
Hair and Make up: Hirokazu Niwa (Maroonbrand), Hisako Araki (Octbre), Hiroshi Miyagi (Squash)
Stylists: Yohei Usami (bNm), Bun, Saori
Executive producers: Masatoshi Sakanoue (Luna Sea Inc.), Masato "Max" Matsuura (Avex Group)
English lyric translations: Jessica Polichetti
Personnel per album's liner notes.

References

External links
 

Luna Sea albums
1991 debut albums
Luna Sea (2011, Re-recorded)
Luna Sea (2011, Re-recorded)
Extasy Records albums